Skautafélagið Björninn, also known as Björninn for short, is an Icelandic sports club, founded in 1990 and based in Reykjavík, Iceland. It began as a skating club that fielded ice hockey teams and included figure skating and curling programs; it eventually added football. 

On 28 September 2018, the club's ice skating departments merged into Ungmennafélagið Fjölnir, which overtook all of the department's assets and debts.

Ice hockey

Men's ice hockey

History
The clubs men's ice hockey team played in the Icelandic Men's Hockey League from the 1991–92 season until 2018. It won the national championship in 2012 after beating Skautafélag Reykjavíkur 3–1 in the best-of-five finals series.

In the early 1990s, Björninn was the first team to invite American service members from nearby NAS Keflavik to play on their team. At the time, each team in the Icelandic League was allowed to put a maximum of 3 non-Icelandic players on their rosters. In 1994, Petty Officer Steve Mitchell, who also played for Björninn, started the first American military team in Iceland, the NATO North Stars. The team shared practice time with Björninn and played several teams in the Icelandic League in exhibitions.

Achievements
Icelandic champion (1): 2012

Season-by-season record

Note: GP = Games played, W = Wins, OTW = Overtime Wins, OTL = Overtime Losses, L = Losses, GF = Goals for, GA = Goals against, Pts = Points

This table includes results from the last five years only.

Women's ice hockey

History
The clubs women's ice hockey team won the national championship in 2006.

Achievements
 Icelandic champion (1): 2006

Figure Skating

Single Skating

History 
The main activity of the figure skating department was singles skating, starting from the Learn to Skate Program up to competitive levels.

Synchronized skating

History 
Björninn had two active teams of synchronized skating, Frostrósir and Ísbirnir.

Football

Men's football
Björninn first fielded a men's football team during the 2010 season in the Icelandic Cup and the 3. deild karla where it served as a feeder club for Ungmennafélagið Fjölnir. In 2019, Björninn finished first in group A of the 4. deild karla. It was knocked out of the playoffs the same year by Hvíti Riddarinn on a 1-4 aggregate score.

References

External links
Official site

1990 establishments in Iceland
Football clubs in Iceland
Ice hockey clubs established in 1990
Icelandic Hockey League
Ice hockey teams in Iceland
Sport in Reykjavík